Zhu Jian may refer to:

 Zhu Youqian (died 926), warlord 
 Zhu Jian (actor) (born 1991), Chinese actor and model